Leucopogon conchifolius is a species of flowering plant in the heath family Ericaceae and is endemic to the south-west of Western Australia. It is an erect shrublet with many branches, more or less round leaves near the ends of branchlets, and white, tube-shaped flowers arranged near the ends of leafy twigs.

Description
The flowers are arranged singly, in pairs or threes in leaf axils near the ends of branchlets, with small egg-shaped, pale green bracts and broadly egg-shaped to round bracteoles. Flowering peaks in mid-March.

Taxonomy and naming
Leucopogon conchifolius was first formally described in 1986 by Arne Strid in the journal Willdenowia from specimens he collected in the Fitzgerald River National Park in 1983. The specific epithet (conchifolius) means "oyster shell-leaved".

Distribution and habitat
This leucopogon grows in heath in the Esperance Plains bioregion of south-western Western Australia.

Conservation status
Leucopogon conchifolius ( as Styphelia conchifolia) is classified as "not threatened" by the Western Australian Government Department of Biodiversity, Conservation and Attractions.

References

conchifolius
Ericales of Australia
Flora of Western Australia
Plants described in 1986
Taxa named by Arne Strid